The effects of Hurricane Isabel in New York and New England were relatively minor and primarily limited to wind damage. Hurricane Isabel formed from a tropical wave on September 6, 2003, in the tropical Atlantic Ocean. It quickly weakened over land and became extratropical over western Pennsylvania the next day.

Damage in New York totaled $90 million (2003 USD, $105 million 2008 USD), with Vermont reporting about $100,000 in damage (2003 USD, $117,000 in 2008 USD). Falling trees from moderate winds downed power lines across the region, causing sporadic power outages. Two people died as a result of the hurricane, both due to the rough surf from Isabel.

Preparations
Hours before Isabel made landfall on North Carolina, the National Hurricane Center issued a tropical storm warning for a portion of the southern Long Island coastline from the New Jersey/New York border to Moriches. About a day before the hurricane moved ashore, forecasters estimated the hurricane possessed a 10% chance of passing within  of New York City. Other portions of southern New England were estimated to have similar probabilities, with the same forecast predicting a 3% chance for it passing within  of Eastport, Maine. By about two days before Isabel struck land until several hours after it moved ashore, forecasters predicted the storm to pass over western New York as a transitioning tropical cyclone before passing into Canada as an extratropical cyclone.

New York Governor George Pataki urged residents to purchase emergency supplies and to fill cars with gasoline. The State Emergency Management Office began preparing for the hurricane about a week before it moved ashore. The office also issued a Level 1 emergency activation, with a planning unit readying contingency plans and in coordinating the efforts of other state offices. The state's National Guard began preliminary preparations for possible support efforts by reviewing the list of personnel able to be mobilized in the event of an emergency. Army and Air National Guard officials identified needed equipment in the event of an emergency, such as helicopters, generators, high-axle vehicles, and communications equipment. State police officers established contingency plans for personnel and equipment to assist as needed. The State Office of Parks, Recreation and Historic Preservation ensured needed equipment were operational, and also secured buildings with sandbags to prevent flooding. Seven airlines allowed travelers potentially affected by the hurricane to reschedule their flights to a later date.

Impact

The pressure gradient between a ridge and Isabel produced strong northeast winds of at least tropical storm force across southeastern New York. The strongest winds occurred in the outer rainbands, during which many trees, tree limbs, and power lines fell across the region. In the New York metropolitan area, moderate winds downed 640 trees and 801 tree limbs. A man driving through Great Neck Estates was critically injured when a tree limb fell onto the car. Additionally, a falling tree branch hit a man in the head, resulting in a serious head injury. In and around New York City, about 1.1 million customers were left without power, though most outages were fixed by the day after the hurricane passed through the region. Offshore of Long Beach, rough waves killed a man while bodysurfing.

Further to the northwest the winds were not as severe, though in some places in the south-central portion of the state the winds downed some trees. A falling tree hit and damaged a car in Cobleskill. The winds also knocked out power to about 3,000 customers in the Schoharie and eastern Mohawk Valleys. In the northeast portion of the state, a few trees and power lines were blown down in Moriah, Westport, and Lewis. In Livingston County, the rainfall overflowed the reservoir, causing moderate flood damage. Initially, gasoline futures on the New York Stock Exchange rose in anticipation of a threat from the hurricane, though later dropped when the storm failed to disrupt oil refining facilities. The hurricane brought unusual birds to the western portion of the state, including petrels and shearwaters normally found in salt-water regions or over the open ocean. Most of the birds died within a few days due to the sudden change in habitat. In Cayuga County, downed power lines lit one building on fire, causing minor smoke and water damage though no injuries. Damage in the state totaled $90 million (2003 USD, $105 million 2008 USD).

Rainfall reached  in portions of western Connecticut and Massachusetts. Strong surf from Isabel caused a man to drown after losing his footing along the beach near Narragansett, Rhode Island, and being swept out to sea. Officials in Connecticut contacted a water company in Watertown and a grocer in Cheshire for donations to assist the residents affected in North Carolina. In Richmond, trees fell on and damaged three trucks, and in Salisbury a falling tree damaged a car. Damage in the state totaled about $100,000 (2003 USD, $117,000 in 2008 USD). Rainfall reached  in various portions of New Hampshire and Maine.

See also

List of New England hurricanes
List of retired Atlantic hurricane names

References

New England
Isabel (2003)
Isabel (2003)
2003 natural disasters in the United States
Isabel